Ystradgynlais Rugby Football Club is a Welsh rugby union club based in Ystradgynlais, Wales. The club is a member of the Welsh Rugby Union and is also a feeder club for the Ospreys.

The club was established in 1890.

Club honours
West Wales Cup Champions (1938)
Swansea Valley Cup (13 Occasions)
Promotion to Heineken League (1991)
Promotion from Division 3 (1993)
Cwmtawe 7s Champions (1994)
Division 2 Champions (1995)
Promotion from Division 5 South West (2008)
West Wales Plate Champions (2008)

Former notable players
 Joe Jones (Wales)
 Steve Bayliss (Wales (RL))
 Anthony Buchanan(Wales)
 Jonny Koloi (Tonga)
 Kevin Hopkins (Wales)
 Tom Hopkins (Wales)
 Stan Wright (Cook Islands)
 Vernon Cooper (Wales)
 Albert Owen (Wales)
 Mark Bennett (Wales)
 David Lewis (Wales B)
 Ogwyn Alexander (Wales B)
 William Lewis Thomas (Final Welsh Trialist)
 Ness Flowers (Wales (RL))
 Dan Baker  (Wales)

Memorable Results
Ystradgynlais 6 Pontarddulais 3 (West Wales Cup Final 1938)
Ystradgynlais 6 Llanelli 6 (Welsh Cup 1978)
Ystradgynlais 9 Garndiffaith 8 (Play Off 1991)
Ystradgynlais 16 Pontypridd 15 (Centenary Game 1991)
Ystradgynlais 10 Newport 9 (Welsh Cup 1994)
Ystradgynlais 52 Cefneithin 10 (West Wales Plate Final 2008)

References

Welsh rugby union teams
Sport in Powys